Bršica  is a port village in Croatia. It is connected by the D421 state road and by ferry. 50km away by sea, or 100km by road, there is a Port of Rijeka terminal which handles livestock, timber and general cargo.

References

Bršica at istra.lzmk.hr

Populated places in Istria County